Frogtown may refer to:

Places
United States
Frogtown, Saint Paul, a neighborhood in Saint Paul, Minnesota
Frogtown, Los Angeles, a neighborhood
Frogtown, Missouri, an unincorporated community
Frogtown, Ohio (disambiguation)
Frogtown, Clarke County, Virginia, an unincorporated community in Clarke County
Frogtown, West Virginia, an unincorporated community in Logan County
Frogtown Creek, a stream in Georgia
Frogtown, Crete, a neighborhood in Crete, IL

Media
Hell Comes to Frogtown, a 1987 film starring Roddy Piper
Return to Frogtown, the 1993 direct-to-video sequel to Hell Comes to Frogtown